Miss Grand Namibia was a Namibian female beauty pageant founded in 2015 by Magnolia Kuhanga, the chairperson of the Windhoek-based organizer, Magnolia Events Management (ML Events Artistry). The pageant was declared defunct in late 2018 after the incorporation between the aforementioned national organizer and Miss Grand International Limited was not extended and no other domestic organizer was interested in the license. Originally, the winners of the contest, which was held three times—in 2015, 2016, and 2018—were expected to represent Namibia on its international parent platform, Miss Grand International. However, all three winners withdrew for unspecified reasons; only one was replaced by an appointed representative, while the other two withdrew from the international pageant completely with no replacements assigned.

Since the first debutant in 2013, Namibian representatives have not obtained any placements at the Miss Grand International pageant.

History
Namibia participated in Miss Grand International twice, in 2013 and 2015, represented by Grace Khakhane and Unongo Kutako, respectively. After Magnolia Events Management, headed by Magnolia Kuhanga, acquired the license in 2015, the national contest, Miss Grand Namibia, was held three times between 2015 and 2018. Since then, there have been no Namibian representatives at Miss Grand International, although the national pageants were additionally held to determine the titleholders in 2016 and 2018.

In 2016, the first preliminary pageant for Miss Grand Namibia, Miss Swakopmund, was held in the city of Swakopmund, Erongo Region. The winner of the said regional pageant was automatically qualified for the national contest, Miss Grand Namibia 2016, held in Windhoek, where Esperance Luvindao, a medical student at the University of Namibia, was elected as the national winner, outclassing the other sixteen finalists. For the most recent edition, Miss Grand Namibia 2018, several regional casting events were conducted nationwide by the national licensee to determine the regional representatives for the national contest, such as Erongo, Khomas, Ohangwena, etc. The national final round was held in Windhoek on May 4, 2018, in which Rail Lucas of Ohangwena Region was announced as the national winner.

Editions
The following list is the edition detail of the Miss Grand Namibia contest, since its inception in 2015.

Representatives at Miss Grand International
Color keys

References

External links
 

Namibia
Beauty pageants in Namibia
Recurring events established in 2015
2015 establishments in Namibia
Namibian awards